Mohamad Zahir bin Abdul Khalid is a Malaysian politician who has served as Speaker of the Perak State Legislative Assembly since May 2020. He served as Member of the Perak State Executive Council (EXCO) in the Barisan Nasional (BN) state administration under former Menteri Besar Zambry Abdul Kadir from 2009 to the collapse of the BN administration in May 2018 and Member of the Perak State Legislative Assembly (MLA) for Kamunting from March 2008 to May 2018. He is a member of the United Malays National Organisation (UMNO), a component party of the BN coalition.

Election Results

Honours 
  :
  Knight of the Order of Cura Si Manja Kini (DPCM) – Dato' (2010)

References

Living people
People from Perak
Malaysian people of Malay descent
Malaysian Muslims
Speakers of the Perak State Legislative Assembly
United Malays National Organisation politicians
Members of the Perak State Legislative Assembly
Perak state executive councillors
21st-century Malaysian politicians
1968 births